Kathaa Animations is an Indian animation studio, aimed at developing original content for Indian as well as global audiences. It is best known for the creation of the animated characters Hum Tum for the film Hum Tum. Hum Tum was one of the most successful animated characters to be used in mainstream Bollywood film.

History

Early history
Kathaa Animations was founded in 2001 by Prakash Nambiar. Targeted at creating original content in the nascent Indian animation industry, the company began its operations in a shared space in an industrial workshop. Initially, the company developed multimedia presentations and corporate films. It developed many promotional materials for Yash Raj Films, the biggest and most successful Indian film production house. During this association with YRF, Kathaa was invited to pitch for their upcoming film with animated characters Hum Tum. The movie became one of the most successful Bollywood films and got critical acclaim for its animation and cartoon strips, which appeared in India's leading newspaper The Times of India. Kathaa is currently creating intellectual properties for the Indian and international market.

Intellectual properties

 The Sea Prince (animated film)
 The legend of Kalari Kutty, (animated series)
 Pammi and I (animated series)
 Magic Letters (animated series)
 Once Upon a Time (animated series)
 Potbelly Narayan (animated short)
 Shakti (animated series)

References

Indian animation studios